Enrico Coveri (26 February 1952 – 8 December 1990) was an Italian fashion designer and entrepreneur from Prato, Italy.

Career 
A former model and stage designer, he founded the eponymous fashion house in Florence and was acclaimed for his creations ever since his first appearance on the catwalks of Milan and Paris in 1977.

His designs are recognizable for their bright colours, prevalence of chromaticism, exuberant fantasy of prints, and taste for eccentricity and enjoyment.

The designer presented his first collection, Touche by Enrico Coveri, in Milan in 1973. His creative talent made him famous in the world of fashion and a representative of the taste "Made in Italy". His first collection for women was presented in Paris in 1977 and brought him instant success and praise of fashion press and opinion-makers. The menswear collection followed soon after. Sequins became his signature mark; Le Figaro wrote: "Sequins are to Coveri what chains are to Chanel."

The house of Enrico Coveri launched several collections for women, men and children, as well as a range of jeans. It added cosmetics to its offer in 1981. Coveri's first fragrance for women, launched in 1982 under the name Paillettes (sequins), was followed by his first fragrance for men, Enrico Coveri pour Homme. In Venice, at Palazzo Moretti, Coveri also threw one of the most extravagant masked balls. In 1985 the collection You Young Coveri, created for a young audience, was released.

One of the most important awards the creator received was the Grande Médaille de Vermeil in Paris in 1987. Enrico Coveri also received the title of Commendatore della Repubblica, which made him the only person under 35 to receive this accolade.

When Enrico Coveri died from lung cancer in 1990, he was succeeded by his sister Silvana. She was familiar with the job, because she had been his manager and assistant. Francesco Martini Coveri, Silvana’s son and the most talented of Enrico’s nephews, also started to be active in fashion design, by becoming Creative Director of You Young Coveri. He became one of the leading figures of the fashion house and is now the main designer and artistic director. Some of the awards he received for his work are the Premio Ago d'oro in 1998, Premio Donna Circe, Premio Arte e Immagine nel mondo in 2002, as well as the American "2004 Designer of the Year Award".

A special honour was paid to the house when a street was named after the designer in 2004: Piazzale Enrico Coveri in Prato.

The house has 15 perfumes. The earliest edition was created in 1984 and the newest in 2017. The nose who worked on the fragrances is Philippe Roques.

External links
Enrico Coveri

References

Italian fashion designers
1952 births
1990 deaths